Malmesbury is a market town in Wiltshire, England.

Malmesbury or Malmsbury may also refer to:

Places
Malmesbury, Western Cape, a farming town in South Africa
Malmsbury, Victoria, a town in Australia
Malmesbury (UK Parliament constituency), a former parliamentary borough

Other uses
 Malmesbury Abbey, Benedictine abbey in Wiltshire, England
 The Earl of Malmesbury, a title in the peerage of Great Britain
 William of Malmesbury, English historian of the 12th century
 County of Malmesbury, former county in Northern Territory, Australia